Frank Moss (16 September 1917 – 1997) was an English professional footballer who is best known for his career with Aston Villa. His playing position was a midfielder. Before playing for Villa, Moss played for Worcester City, Wolverhampton Wanderers and Sheffield Wednesday. He then retired due to injury.

In 1944–45, he made 15 guest appearances for Southampton.

References

1917 births
1997 deaths
Association football defenders
English footballers
Worcester City F.C. players
Wolverhampton Wanderers F.C. players
Sheffield Wednesday F.C. players
Aston Villa F.C. players
Southampton F.C. wartime guest players
English Football League players
Association football midfielders